John William Ackroyd (1895–?) was an English footballer who played in the Football League for Exeter City, Grimsby Town and Rotherham County. He also played for Halifax Town and Scunthorpe & Lindsey United. He was born in Rotherham, England.

References

English footballers
Halifax Town A.F.C. players
Grimsby Town F.C. players
Exeter City F.C. players
Rotherham County F.C. players
Scunthorpe United F.C. players
English Football League players
1895 births
Association football defenders
Year of death missing